Al-Watan (in Arabic الوطن meaning The Homeland) was a Kuwaiti Arabic language daily published by the Al Watan publishing house. The editor in chief was Khalifa Al Ali Al Sabah, a member of the Kuwaiti ruling family, Al Sabah. The paper was in circulation between 1974 and 2015.

History and profile
The paper was launched in 1974. Al Watan was suspended by the Kuwaiti government on 30 August 1976. In April 2014, the paper and  Alam Al Youm were temporarily closed down for two weeks by the Kuwaiti government due to the publication of a videotape showing former senior officials plotting a coup in Kuwait. In June 2014, both papers were shut down for five days because of the same reason.

In January 2015, the Kuwaiti government shut down Al Watan basen on the grounds that the newspaper had violated the license law, since it had less than enough capital to maintain a license.

Circulation
Al Watan sold 86,000 copies in 2001 making it the second best selling newspaper in the country. The 2006 circulation of the paper was 100,000 copies.

The paper's online version was the second most visited website for 2010 in the MENA region.

References

External links
 Official website

1974 establishments in Kuwait
2015 disestablishments in Kuwait
Arabic-language newspapers
Defunct newspapers published in Kuwait
Publications established in 1974
Publications disestablished in 2015